The Youngest Son is a 2010 Italian comedy drama film directed by Pupi Avati. It entered the 2010 WorldFest-Houston International Film Festival, in which it won the Remi Grand Award for best theatrical feature. For this film Christian De Sica won Nastro d'Argento for best actor and Luca Zingaretti was awarded with a Nastro d'Argento for best supporting actor.

Plot
Luciano Baietti (Christian De Sica) is a man who has always taken advantage of the weakness of character of his wife Fiamma (Laura Morante) and his two sons Paul and Baldo. In fact, he, getting with deception, cheating, fraud and tax evasion for hotels and restaurant chains and small corporations, which now has abandoned his wife and children after marriage, psychologically destroying Fiamma and Baldo. Paul is the only one who has overcome the trauma, harboring a deep hatred of true parent and repeatedly threatened with death. After about twenty years of marriage, Luciano finds himself in trouble for all the tricks he did with his secretaries and Sticker Pillar who trust him blindly, and now must find a way out. Will find it in his youngest son Baldo which although has which 20 years is still a big kid dominated by the mother, who tries to rebuild his life creandosi a poor musical group of which he is the singer together with an old friend, but also his brother who treated as a mental patient. So Baldo, believing that review after so many years, the beloved father was invited to his villa why are headed all the properties and buildings that his father bought the scam. However, Luciano, who hopes to be saved from disaster by a second marriage is discovered, the wedding go awry, and he was arrested by the police. Baldo increasingly confused and desperate to return home to his family, and soon also joins Luciano, now reduced to a pauper after release from prison.

Cast 
 Christian De Sica: Luciano Baietti
 Laura Morante: Fiamma
 Luca Zingaretti: Bollino
 Nicola Nocella: Baldo Baietti
 Matilde Matteucci: Roberta
 Marcello Maietta: Paolo Baietti
 Maurizio Battista: Nazareno 
 Massimo Bonetti: Pilastro 
 Alessandra Acciai: Dina Diasparro 
 Pino Quartullo: the helicopter pilot
 Sydne Rome: Sheyla

References

External links

2010 films
Italian comedy-drama films
2010 comedy-drama films
Films directed by Pupi Avati